Wesley Euley (born 10 October 1979) is a South African cricketer. He played in nine first-class, twenty List A, and seven Twenty20 matches from 2003 to 2007.

References

External links
 

1979 births
Living people
South African cricketers
Boland cricketers
Cape Cobras cricketers
Western Province cricketers
Place of birth missing (living people)